Soldier X is a young adult war drama book written by Don Wulffson about a half-German and half-Russian boy named Erik Brandt who joins the Wehrmacht, Hitler's army, during World War II. The book tells about the war from the perspective of Erik Brandt as he leads a life as both a German and a Russian, as well as the ways in which war can affect a person.

The book won the 2002 Christopher Award for books for young adults, and was on the 2002 National Council for the Social Studies list of notable books for young readers.

References 

2003 American novels
American young adult novels
Novels set during World War II
Novels set in Europe